Stoddard County Courthouse is a historic courthouse located at Bloomfield, Stoddard County, Missouri. It was built between 1867 and 1870, as a two-story, brick building on a concrete foundation. It was enlarged and remodeled in 1909 in the Classical Revival style. It has a hipped cross-gable roof topped by a massive clock tower or cupola.

It was listed on the National Register of Historic Places in 1984.

References

Clock towers in Missouri
County courthouses in Missouri
Courthouses on the National Register of Historic Places in Missouri
Neoclassical architecture in Missouri
Government buildings completed in 1870
Buildings and structures in Stoddard County, Missouri
National Register of Historic Places in Stoddard County, Missouri